Current Problems in Surgery is a monthly peer reviewed academic journal of surgery published by Elsevier. According to the Journal Citation Reports, the journal has a 2021 impact factor of 2.815.

References

External links

Elsevier academic journals
Surgery journals
Publications established in 1964
Monthly journals
English-language journals